Jean Lambert-Rucki (1888–1967) was a Polish avant-garde artist, sculptor, and graphic artist. He was best known for his participation in the Cubist, Surrealist and Art Deco movements. He exhibited at the 1913 Salon d'Automne in Paris; from
1919 was represented by both Léonce Rosenberg at the Galerie de l'Effort Moderne and the art dealer Paul Guillaume. In March 1920, Lambert-Rucki exhibited at the second exhibition of la Section d'Or, Galerie de La Boétie, Paris, and participated in the first exhibition of l'Union des Artistes Modernes, where he continued to show his works. He worked with diverse styles and media, at times he was influenced by the tribal art of Africa. Lambert-Rucki also became well known for his Cubist cityscapes.

Early life

Born in 1888 in Kraków, Poland, Jean Lambert-Rucki was the youngest of a large family. He was eleven years old when his father died suddenly. A child prodigy, he earned a living by making portraits that surprised the Bourgeoisie of Kraków.

He attended art school in his hometown to pursue his studies, and then went to the School of Fine Arts in Kraków where he became friends with Moïse Kisling, who was an artist he found n Paris. His youth was marked by immersion in the rich folklore of Central Europe. He made several trips to Russia, frequented gypsies, and learned Russian dances. His work throughout his career remained deeply imbued with the product of these early experiences.

Enthused by an exhibition of works by Gauguin in Kraków, he decided to go to Paris and arrived one morning in February 1911 with 17 Francs in his pocket. He immediately met friends of Polish origin who hosted him. He enrolled at the Académie Colarossi where he mingled with bohemian artists of Montparnasse at Le Dôme Café and Café de la Rotonde. There he met Chaïm Soutine, Léopold Survage, Tsuguharu Foujita, Blaise Cendrars, Max Jacob and Amedeo Modigliani; who he shared a room with at 8 rue de la Grande-Chaumière in Montparnasse, a studio rented to them by the Polish poet, writer and art dealer Léopold Zborowski.

Lambert-Rucki earned his living by retouching photographs in Montmartre, something which did not fulfill his monetary needs. In 1913 he moved into a studio at 29 rue Campagne Première in the 14th arrondissement of Paris. In 1914 he engaged in the French Foreign Legion to serve France during the war. He changed his name to Jean Lambert-Rucki. He was wounded during the war and he was assigned to the Archeological Service at the Archaeological Museum of Thessaloniki in Greece, where he conducted excavations. He later made copies of the mosaics of Sainte Sophie de Salonique for the Louvre under the direction of Jean Guiffrey the Curator for the Department of Painting, Musées nationaux.

During his military service he befriended sculptors Joseph Csaky and Gustave Miklos. Miklos became the godfather of Lambert-Rucki's daughter Théano, called "Mara". In 1918, demobilized, Lambert-Rucki returned to Paris where he settled at 12 rue du Moulin-de-Beurre in the Montparnasse district.

After World War I
With the support given by Léonce Rosenberg from 1918, Cubism returned as a central issue for artists. With the Parisian Salons dominated by a Return to order, the artist, theorist Albert Gleizes attempted to resuscitate the spirit of the Section d'Or in 1920, with the aim of introducing innovative artists of different nationalities to the general public, and organizing exhibitions with literary and musical auditions in many countries. Further support for the endeavor came from Fernand Léger, Alexander Archipenko, Georges Braque, Constantin Brâncuși, Henri Laurens, Jacques Villon, Raymond Duchamp-Villon, Louis Marcoussis, Joseph Csaky, Léopold Survage and Jean Lambert-Rucki.

In 1920 Lambert-Rucki married Monique Bickel (born 1892), who was a pupil of the sculptor Auguste Rodin. Their daughter Mara Rucki was born 7 April 1920.

In 1923 he became friends with the Coppersmith Jean Dunand, with whom he worked with for twenty years. He refused the proposal of Jean Dunand to co-sign their works (except at the very beginning of their cooperation).

From 1925 to the end of his life, Lambert-Rucki exhibited his works, many of which were commissioned, throughout Europe, Canada and the United States, and churches (large renovations after the Great War). The same year, he collaborated with Émile-Jacques Ruhlmann and Jean Dunand for the International Exposition of Modern Industrial and Decorative Arts of 1925, the exhibition that epitomized what came to be called decades later Art Deco, a "modern" style characterized by a streamlined geometric and symmetric compositions, and a sleek machine-age look.

In 1930 Lambert-Rucki became one of the pioneers of Modern Religious Art. In 1931, he became an active member of the Union des Artistes Modernes (UAM), where he exhibited alongside René Herbst, Charles-Edouard Jeanneret (Le Corbusier), Robert Mallet-Stevens, the architect Georges-Henri Pingusson, Jean Fouquet (for whom he made jewelry), in exhibits that emphasized design over decoration.

Jean Lambert-Rucki became a naturalized French citizen in 1932.

In 1933, he left his Montparnasse studio for one at 26 Rue des Plantes, Paris. In May 1943, he participated in a group exhibition of artists in the "2ème groupe" at Galerie Drouant-David in Paris.

He remained solitary throughout his life, fleeing the world with its demands and its vanities. His raison d'être was the incessant need to create something "new".

Death 
In 1967 at the of 80, he died at his home at Rue des Plantes, Paris, France from a vascular disease.

Exhibitions during his life-time
 1913, Salon d'Automne
 1919, Salon d'Automne, Léonce Rosenberg (Galerie de l'Effort Moderne) and with the dealer Paul Guillaume
 1920, the second exhibition of la Section d'Or, Galerie de La Boétie and the Salon des Indépendants
 1923, one man show at Galerie de l'Effort Moderne
 1925, l'Hôtel du Collectionneur and the Fumoir, with Jacques-Emile Ruhlmann and Jean Dunand
 1932, presents a religious sculpture at the Crémaillère that provokes a scandal that forced him to remove his work from the exhibition
 1934, first manifestation d'Art Sacré at l'Hôtel des Ducs de Rohan
 1936, participates at the manifestation d'Art Sacré, l'OGAR (Office Général d'Art Religieux), 241 bd St Germain
 1937, Exposition Internationale, Pavillon de l'U.A.M. He creates l'Accueil des Artistes Modernes, a sculpted wall at the entrance, and several masks and sculptures inside the pavillon. He presents Bonhomme Lambert at the Pavillon de la Lumière. He participates in the Pavillon de la Solidarité Nationale and makes jewelry for Jean Fouquet. The French State commissions a sculpture entitled l'Homme au pardessus.
 1938, Exposition de l'Art Sacré, Pavillon Marial
 1942, Solo exhibition at Galerie Drouant-David, where he exhibits paintings and sculpture 
 1943, exhibits surrealist drawings rue d'Anjou. Exhibition "2ème groupe", Galerie Drouant-David
 1947, Exposition de la Céramique Française Contemporaine, Baden-Baden, then in Vienna
 1949, Salon des Artistes-Décorateurs
 1953, solo exhibition Galerie La " Gentilhommière ", Boulevard Raspail
 1954, solo exhibition Galerie Drouant-David, 52 rue du Faubourg Saint Honoré
 1958, exhibition Cairo, Egypt

Selected works
 La visite, 1919, 65 x 92 cm, Musée des Années 30, Boulogne-Billancourt, Dépôt du Centre Georges Pompidou, 1995
 Composition, 1919, oil on canvas, 56.5 × 47 cm, Musée d'Évreux
 Les Promeneurs, 1924, oil on panel, 33.5 × 46.5 cm Musée d'Évreux
 Several works at the Musée départemental de l'Oise
 Saint Sebastien, 1950, sculpted wood, monochrome paint, 181 x 48 x 25 cm, Mont-de-Marsan; musée de la ville

Selected literature
 Artur Winiarski, Jean Lambert-Rucki, Warsaw, 2017 
 J. Lambert-Rucki, Marc-André Ruan, Jean-Pierre Tortil, 1988
 Lambert-Rucki: A Lyrical Surrealist, Soufer Gallery, 199?
 Gargallo, Csáky, Lambert-Rucki: exposition Mairie de Paris, Musée Bourdelle, Pablo Gargallo, Jozsef Csáky, 1977
 Jean Lambert-Rucki, 1888–1967: vente, Hôtel Drouot, salle 1, M A Ruan, J P Tortil & Jacques de Vos, 1971
 Jean Lambert-Rucki: présentation d'une donation, 11 octobre 1997-18 janvier 1998, Musée départemental de l'Oise, Beauvais, 1997
 Jean-Lambert-Rucki (1888–1967): Un sculpteur au service de l'Eglise (1938–1967), Alain Choubart, 1992
 Atelier Jean Lambert-Rucki et Mara Rucki, Hôtel Drouot, 1981
 Jean Lambert-Rucki : et les modernes classiques : Galerie Franka Berndt Bastille, Paris, du 13 septembre au 31 octobre 1990, Hôtel des ventes (Enghien-les-Bains, France), 1990
 Lambert-Rucki et les modernes classiques: Exposition. Franka Berndt Bastille, Galerie (Paris), 1990
 Alexandre Vialatte au miroir de l'imaginaire, 2003
 Collection Mara Et Léano Rucki, 25 Sculptures de Jean Lambert-Rucki. Mara Rucki, Léano Rucki, Tajan SA., 2003
 Lambert-Rucki [1888–1967]: collection Jacques De Vos et à divers amateurs; Art nouveau, art déco : vente, Paris, Drouot-Montaigne, 9 mars 1994, commissaires-priseurs, Mes Christian de Quay, Delavenne et Lafarge, Jacques De Vos, 1994
 Art contemporain: Paul Kallos, né en 1928, bel ensemble de 18 oeuvres de 1954 à 1984, ensemble exceptionnel d'oeuvres de Jean Lambert-Rucki, 1888–1967, 12 sculptures, épreuves d'artistes, 2 tableaux provenant de la famille de l'artiste : vente, Paris, Drouot-Montaigne, 14 avril 1992, commissaire-priseur, Me Pierre Cornette de Saint-Cyr Paul Kallos, Jean Lambert- Rucki, 1992
 L'Abbaye de Saint-Benoît-du-Lac et ses bâtisseurs, Claude Bergeron, Geoffrey Simmins, Jean Rochon (dom.), 1997
 History of Modern Design: Graphics and Products Since the Industrial Revolution, David Raizman, 2003
 Modern Figurative Paintings, 1890–1950: The Paris Connection, Martin Wolpert, Jeffrey Winter, 2004
 Collection Sjöberg: Jean Lambert-Rucki, Roger Bezombes, Henri Sjöberg, Drouot, 2002
 The Originality of the Avant-garde and Other Modernist Myths, Rosalind E. Krauss, 1986
 Marcel Breuer and a Committee of Twelve Plan a Church: A Monastic Memoir, Hilary Thimmesh, Marcel Breuer, 2011
 Jean Dunand: his life and works, Félix Marcilhac, 1991,
 橋本指輪コレクション: Historic Rings, Diana Scarisbrick, 2004
 Liturgical Arts, 1959
 International Art Market, 1983
 Library Catalog of the Metropolitan Museum of Art, New York: Metropolitan Museum of Art (New York, N.Y.). Library, 1987
 Jean Lambert-Rucki, 1888–1967, Jacques de Vos, Paris, 1991
 Art Deco, Judith Miller, 2007
 
 Les Africanistes, peintres voyageurs: 1860–1960, Lynne Thornton, 1990
 History of art, Kirsten Bradbury, 2005
 The encyclopedia of art deco, Alastair Duncan, 1998
 Christie's Art Deco, Fiona Gallagher, Simon Andrews, Michael Jeffery, 2000
 Art Deco, Victor Arwas, 2000
 Art deco 1910–1939, Tim Benton, Charlotte Benton, Ghislaine Wood, 2003
 The Andy Warhol collection: sold for the benefit of the Andy Warhol Foundation for the Visual Arts, Volume 1, Andy Warhol, John L. Marion, Andy Warhol Foundation for the Visual Arts, 1988
 20th Century Decorative Arts, Sotheby's (Firm), 1990
 The design encyclopedia, Mel Byars, 2004
 Rings: Through the Ages, Anne G. Ward, 1981
 Art, Design, Photo, Alexander Davis, 1973
 "Primitivism" in 20th century art: affinity of the tribal and the modern, Volume 2, William Stanley Rubin, Museum of Modern Art (New York, N.Y.), 1984
 Art Deco Interiors: Decoration and Design Classics of the 1920s and 1930s, Patricia Bayer, 1998
 Autour d'un piano de Jean Dunand: sculpteur, dinandier, laqueur, 1877–1942, Jean Dunand, Galerie Jacques de Vos, Claire Bussac, 1991
 Art Deco, Eva Weber, 2004
 Collection Mara et Léano Rucki: 25 sculptures de Jean Lambert-Rucki, Félix Marcilhac, 2003
 Kisling and his friends, Barbara Brus-Malinowska, Jerzy Malinowski, Muzeum Narodowe w Warszawie, 1996

Catalogue raisonné
A Catalogue raisonné of the works of Jean Lambert-Rucki is being prepared by the Comité Jean Lambert-Rucki (an association created 29 October 2008 and declared in the Journal Officiel 12 November 2008).

References

External links
 Agence Photographique de la Réunion des musées nationaux et du Grand Palais des Champs-Elysées
 Comité Jean Lambert-Rucki
 Brève biographie de Jean Lambert Rucki
 25 sculptures de Jean Lambert-Rucki à l'espace Tajan
 Op de hoogte jrg 34, 1937, no 5, pp. 143–145 (article published in the Netherlands)

1888 births
1967 deaths
Artists from Kraków
Polish sculptors
Polish male sculptors
Polish painters
Polish male painters
Modern sculptors
Modern painters
Polish surrealist artists
Cubist artists
20th-century French sculptors
French male sculptors
School of Paris
Art Deco artists
Abstract sculptors
20th-century French painters
20th-century French male artists
French male painters
French military personnel of World War I
Académie Colarossi alumni
French abstract artists
Polish emigrants to France